ZMPSTE24 is a human gene. The protein encoded by this gene is a metallopeptidase. It is involved in the processing of lamin A. Defects in the ZMPSTE24 gene lead to similar laminopathies as defects in lamin A, because the latter is a substrate for the former.  In humans, a mutation abolishing the ZMPSTE24 cleavage site in prelamin A causes a progeroid disorder.  Failure to correctly process prelamin A leads to deficient ability to repair DNA double-strand breaks.

As shown by Liu et al., lack of Zmpste24 prevents lamin A formation from its precursor farnesyl-prelamin A. Lack of ZMPSTE24 causes progeroid phenotypes in mice and humans.  This lack increases DNA damage and chromosome aberrations and sensitivity to DNA-damaging agents that cause double-strand breaks.  Also, lack of ZMPSTE24 allows an increase in non-homologous end joining, but a deficiency in steps leading to  homologous recombinational DNA repair.

See also
 Progeria
 Progeroid syndromes

References

External links